Taoughilt is a small town and rural commune in Sidi Kacem Province of the Rabat-Salé-Kénitra region of Morocco. At the time of the 2004 census, the commune had a total population of 14,108 people living in 2,100 households.

References

Populated places in Sidi Kacem Province
Rural communes of Rabat-Salé-Kénitra